Christin Hagberg (born Nilsson in 1958) is a Swedish social democratic politician. She has been a member of the Riksdag since 2002. She was also a member from 1995 to 1998.

External links
Christin Hagberg at the Riksdag website

Members of the Riksdag from the Social Democrats
Living people
1958 births
Women members of the Riksdag
Members of the Riksdag 2002–2006
21st-century Swedish women politicians